The 2016–17 season was Real Betis's second consecutive season in La Liga after spending 2014–15 in the Segunda División.

Squad

Competitions

Overall

La Liga

League table

Results Summary

Matches

Copa del Rey

Round of 32

Statistics

Appearances and goals
Last updated on 20 May 2017.

|-
! colspan=14 style=background:#dcdcdc; text-align:center|Goalkeepers

|-
! colspan=14 style=background:#dcdcdc; text-align:center|Defenders

|-
! colspan=14 style=background:#dcdcdc; text-align:center|Midfielders

|-
! colspan=14 style=background:#dcdcdc; text-align:center|Forwards

|-
! colspan=14 style=background:#dcdcdc; text-align:center| Players who have made an appearance or had a squad number this season but have left the club either permanently or on loan

|-
|}

References

External links
 Club's official website

Real Betis seasons
Real Betis